Bradley I. Randle (born September 17, 1990) is an American football running back who is currently a free agent. He played college football at Nevada-Las Vegas. He is Co-Founder of lifestyle brand , Running Back Guru University

Professional career

2013 Nevada, Las Vegas's Pro Day

Minnesota Vikings
On April 28, 2013, he signed with the Minnesota Vikings as an undrafted free agent.  Randle was released by the Vikings on August 26, 2013 (along with 12 others) to get to a 75-man roster. On September 4, 2013, he was signed to the practice squad again, and then released on September 10, 2013. Finally, Randle was re-signed to the Vikings practice squad on December 11, 2013 where he remained. Randle was released on May 13, 2014.

BC Lions
Randle was signed by the BC Lions on September 30, 2014. Randle had only 2 carries during the 2014 regular season but he managed to gain 35 yards (19 and 16 yards each). He also returned 3 punts for a total of 9 yards (only 3 yards per return).

Winnipeg Blue Bombers 
On March 9, 2015 Randle and the Winnipeg Blue Bombers of the Canadian Football League agreed to a contract.

References

External links
BC Lions bio 
UNLV Rebels bio
Minnesota Vikings bio

1990 births
Living people
Minnesota Vikings players
UNLV Rebels football players